Hajvalia is a village or suburb southeast of Prishtina, located 635 meters above sea level. It lies in the municipality of Prishtina. It has approximately 2,300 homes and 7 391 (2011) inhabitants. A small creek begins in the town, while another begins north-east of the town and runs through it.
After 1970, right up until now, there has been an increase in population, mainly from newcomers.

The road here passes through Gjilan and Prishtinë and connects with M25.2 way.

Demographics

Places of interest
There is a zinc and silver mine, which opened in 1953 and have been completely renovated, namely the Trepča Mines-Pristina (Hajvalia).
A public park is located near the town-centre, along the Dëshmorët e Gollakut (Lit. Gollak Martyrs road).
There is a mosque, Xhamia e Hajvalisë (Lit. Mosque of Hajvalia), in the south-west of the village.

Sport
The local football club was KF Hajvalia.

Education
There are two primary schools in Hajvalia. With the most recently opened one "Afrim Gashi" being opened roughly 11 years ago ; named after the martyr which was a habitant of Hajvalia . The other Elementary School is "Shkëndija" (Lit. "Spark").

Other
Behgjet Pacolli AKR chairman and former president of Kosovo is a resident. In Hajvalija there is the International Village. After the war it saw development of small businesses and private businesses.

Notes

References

Villages in Pristina